Lewis Edson (22 January 1748 – 1820 in Woodstock, New York) was one of the first American composers. He began working as blacksmith, but soon after became a singing master and was a notable singer in his day.  His most popular compositions were Bridgewater, Lenox and Green Field and were published in 1782 in the "Choristers Companion".

List of works
Bridgewater – choral hymn
Lenox – choral hymn View Score at Hymnary.org
Newton – choral hymn
Green Field – choral hymn

Scores
Volume 3. Three New York Composers: The Collected Works of Lewis Edson, Lewis Edson, Jr., and Nathaniel Billings, edited by Karl Kroeger.

References

External links
 Amaranth Publishing
 Calvin Institute of Christian Worship

American male composers
19th-century American composers
1748 births
1820 deaths
People from Woodstock, New York
People of the Province of New York
American blacksmiths
19th-century American male musicians